"Cry Tough" is the debut single by the American glam metal band Poison. It was featured on the group's first album Look What the Cat Dragged In.

Background
"Cry Tough" was released as a single in 1986 on Capitol Records' Enigma label. It is about believing in oneself to make one's dreams come true.

The B-side is the title track "Look What The Cat Dragged In".

The song failed to chart in the US but charted at number 97 on the UK Singles Chart.

Music video
The song's video was placed on New York Times list of the 15 Essential Hair-Metal Videos.

Albums
"Cry Tough" is on the following albums:

 Look What the Cat Dragged In
 Poison's Greatest Hits: 1986-1996
 The Best of Poison: 20 Years of Rock
 Look What the Cat Dragged In - 20th Anniversary Edition
 Double Dose: Ultimate Hits

Chart performance

References

1986 debut singles
Poison (American band) songs
1986 songs
Songs written by Bobby Dall
Songs written by Bret Michaels
Songs written by Rikki Rockett
Songs written by C.C. DeVille
Enigma Records singles
Capitol Records singles